Heat in the Street is a rock album by the Pat Travers Band. It was released in 1978 on Polydor Records.
It is the first with the most popular of Travers' band line-ups, Travers on guitar, Peter "Mars" Cowling on bass guitar, Pat Thrall also on guitar and Tommy Aldridge on drums.

Track listing
Side One
"Heat In The Street" (Jeffrey Lesser, Travers) - 4:29
"Killer's Instinct" (Lesser, Travers) - 5:09
"I Tried To Believe" (Travers) - 5:05
"Hammerhead" [ Instr. ] (Cowling, Travers) - 3:04

Side Two
"Go All Night" (Travers) - 3:58
"Evie" (Harry Vanda, George Young) - 4:14
"Prelude" [instr.] (Travers) - 3:39
"One For Me And One For You" (Travers) - 6:12

Personnel
Tommy Aldridge - drums
Peter 'Mars' Cowling - bass guitar
Pat Thrall - guitar, guitar synthesizer, backing vocals
Pat Travers - guitar, keyboard, vocals

Charts
Album - Billboard

References 

1978 albums
Pat Travers albums
Polydor Records albums